Bekri may refer to:

People with the forename
Bekri Mustafa Pasha (d. 1690), Ottoman official

People with the surname
Hafsa Bekri (born 1948), Moroccan poet
Nur Bekri (born 1961), Chinese politician
Sara El Bekri (born 1987), Moroccan swimmer
Tahar Bekri (born 1951), Tunisian poet
Wissam El Bekri (1984), French-Tunisian football player